Kennedy Road is a road in the Mid-Levels on Hong Kong Island, Hong Kong. It is named after Arthur Kennedy, the seventh governor of Hong Kong.

History
At the time of construction in 1876, it was the second major east–west route from the sea, in the local area. Thus being nicknamed second road.

Location
Starting from Garden Road in the west, it goes past St. Joseph's College, Hong Kong Visual Arts Centre, Hong Kong Park and Hopewell Centre and ends at the junction with Queen's Road East near Morrison Hill in Wan Chai.

Features
 No. 1: Zetland Hall Masonic Lodge
 No. 6: a Grade II Historic Building
 No. 7: St. Joseph's College. The North and West Blocks are declared monuments
 No. 7A: Hong Kong Visual Arts Centre, housed in the former Cassels Block, former barracks for married British officers, of Victoria Barracks. (a Grade I Historic Building)
 No. 8: a Grade II Historic Building
 No. 9–13: St. Francis' Canossian College
 No. 15: Former Tung Chi College. The building is mostly demolished
 No. 17: Hopewell Centre. Back entrance on the 17th floor
 No. 22A: Union Church
 No. 25–27: Hong Kong Tang King Po College
 No. 26: St. Joseph's College (an extension of the campus) (a Grade I Historic Building)
 No. 28: Office of Former Chief Executives (a Grade I Historic Building)
 No. 39: Phoenix Court 
 No. 42: Office of the Commissioner of the Ministry of Foreign Affairs of the People's Republic of China in the Hong Kong Special Administrative Region
 No. 42A: Jockey Club New Life Hostel, housed in the former Roberts Block of Victoria Barracks (a Grade I Historic Building)
 No. 42B: Mother's Choice Limited, housed in the former Montgomery Block of Victoria Barracks (a Grade I Historic Building)
 No. 44: Hongkong Electric Centre
 No. 64: a Grade III Historic Building
 No. 84: Bamboo Grove

Public transportation
The Kennedy Road station of the Peak Tram is located on Kennedy Road.

Other forms of public transportation near or in Kennedy Road include:

 Mass Transit Railway (MTR) located in Wan Chai which is at the end of the junction
 Public light bus (also known as the mini bus) including Green Mini Bus Route 28 which runs through Caine Road, Nethersol Hospital, University of Hong Kong, Queen Mary Hospital, and Pok Fu Lam
 Tram Located on Johnston Road next to MTR exit A3

See also
 Hong Kong Park
Mount Parish
 Central and Western Heritage Trail
 List of streets and roads in Hong Kong

References

External links

Google Maps of Kennedy Road

Central, Hong Kong
Mid-Levels
Wan Chai
Roads on Hong Kong Island